Hypogastruroidea is a superfamily of springtails in the order Poduromorpha. There are at least 2 families and more than 700 described species in Hypogastruroidea.

Families
These two families belong to the superfamily Hypogastruroidea. Pachytullbergiidae is sometimes included in this superfamily, also.
 Hypogastruridae Börner, 1906
 Paleotullbergiidae Stach, 1954

References

Further reading

External links

Poduromorpha
Arthropod superfamilies